Neon City Rockers is the second studio album by Finnish glam rock singer Jann Wilde. Released on 27 August 2008 it the only Jann Wilde album under the band name Jann Wilde & The Neon Comets. The album draws influences from rock music dating from the 1950s to 1970s.

Reception 
Reviews were generally very good. At soundi-fi reviewer Tero Alanko found the album to be "fresh and catchy" although clearly with influences from Suede and David Bowie. The album was awarded 4 stars, although negative attention was drawn to the poor quality of the artwork. At Terrorverlag the album was awarded 9 out of 10.

Track listing

Personnel 
Dean Martini – Bass, Synth (tracks: 1, 4, and 12)
Tender Rexx – Drums (tracks: 1 to 3, 5 to 12), Percussion (tracks 1, 4 and 5).
Robin Savage – Guitar
Kaide Palmer – Keyboards, vocals
Jann Wilde – Vocals

Guest musicians 
Mirja Mattinen – Cello (tracks: 10, 12)
Timo Lampila – Saxophone (tracks: 7)
Antti Volter – Synth (tracks: 8)
Jenni-Sofia Peippo – Violin (tracks: 10 and 12)
Poppy Starley – Vocals (tracks 1 and 9)

Production 
Jann Wilde & The Comets – Arranged By
Svante Forsback – Mastered By
Mauri Pennanen – Photography By [Band]
Katri Kallio, Venla Muikku – Photography By [Live]
Mefisto Miettinen – Producer

External links 
Discogs.com page

References 

Jann Wilde albums
2008 albums